Raber may refer to:

People
Thomas Raber, Austrian composer and producer

Places
Raber, Indiana
Raber Township, Michigan
Raber Township, Hughes County, South Dakota